Tvashtar Paterae compose an active volcanic region of Jupiter's moon Io located near its north pole. It is a series of paterae, or volcanic craters. It is named after Tvashtar, the Hindu god of blacksmiths. Tvashtar was discovered in IRTF images in November 26 1999, several hours after a Galileo flyby. Images taken with the ESO 3.6m telescope and its adaptive optics in September 1999 revealed the presence of faint hot spot (labeled 990930D). The outburst was  studied by the Galileo spacecraft over several years.

The hot spot awakening of Tvashtar was observed on 02 June 2006 with the Keck Adaptive Optics system and followed up for 530 days making it the longest outburst eruption ever observed on Io. On February 26, 2007 the eruption was photographed by the New Horizons probe as it went past Jupiter en route to Pluto.

See also 
List of extraterrestrial volcanoes
Tvashtar

References

External links 
 
 "VOLCANIC ACTIVITY AT TVASHTAR CATENA, IO", Lunar and Planetary Science XXXV (2004)

Volcanoes of Io (moon)
Active volcanoes
Surface features of Io (moon)
New Horizons